Khalid Latif (born 4 November 1985) is a Pakistani former cricketer  who has been banned for five years, for his involvement in spot-fixing.

A right-handed opening batsman, Latif captained Pakistan in the 2004 U-19 Cricket World Cup win and the 2010 Asian Games bronze medal win.

Career
Khalid Latif was captain of the Pakistani side which won the Under-19 World Cup in 2004. He was the highest scorer for Pakistan at the 2004 U-19 World Cup, scoring 291 runs in eight innings. Latif made his One Day International (ODI) debut at Faisalabad against Zimbabwe in 2008 and the same year he made his Twenty20 International debut against Zimbabwe.

In November 2009, during the 1st ODI against New Zealand, he scored a patient 64 runs from 112 balls in a 138 runs win at the Sheikh Zayed Stadium in Abu Dhabi.

In January 2010, during the 5th ODI at Perth against Australia, Latif was tackled from behind by a spectator who rushed onto the field. The ICC later asked Cricket Australia for a detailed report into the breach of security.

Latif then captained the Pakistan cricket team in the 2010 Asian Games. He stated that his goal was to help his team win the gold medal in the games. However, he had to settle for a bronze, after losing to Afghanistan in the semi finals. He was selected in the Pakistan squad for the 2016 ICC World Twenty20.

In 2016, Latif scored a fifty in a blistering knock to take his side to victory versus England in the only T20.

2017 Pakistan Super League spot-fixing

On 10 February 2017, he was provisionally suspended under the Pakistan Cricket Board's (PCB) anti-corruption code as part of an ongoing investigation into an organisation's alleged attempts to corrupt the 2017 Pakistan Super League. On 18 February, Latif, along with teammate Sharjeel Khan, was formally charged by the PCB for violating the anti-corruption code.

On 20 September, Latif was banned for five years from all forms of cricket in a short verdict announced by a three-man PCB tribunal. He was also fined ₨. 1 million (approx. USD 9,489) and was found guilty of six major breaches of the PCB's anti-corruption code. Latif did not show up to hear the verdict being announced.

Dutch caricature contest
In August 2018, he placed bounty of $24,000 on Dutch politician Geert Wilders for holding caricature contest depicting Muhammad. The contest is organized by Wilders in Dutch Parliament and will have more than 200 entries, judged by American cartoonist and former Muslim Bosch Fawstin.

References

External links
 

1985 births
Living people
Pakistani cricketers
Pakistan One Day International cricketers
Pakistan Twenty20 International cricketers
National Bank of Pakistan cricketers
Cricketers at the 2010 Asian Games
Asian Games bronze medalists for Pakistan
Asian Games medalists in cricket
Cricketers from Karachi
Port Qasim Authority cricketers
Karachi Whites cricketers
Karachi Blues cricketers
Allied Bank Limited cricketers
Sindh cricketers
Karachi Zebras cricketers
Karachi Dolphins cricketers
Rajshahi Royals cricketers
Islamabad United cricketers
Medalists at the 2010 Asian Games
Cricketers banned for corruption